John Delane may refer to:
 John Thadeus Delane, editor of The Times (London)
 John Edward Delane, American racing driver and businessman